Joseph Chialo (born 1970) is a German singer, music manager, and politician of Tanzanian descent. In 2021, he was a candidate of the Christian Democratic Union (CDU) in the Berlin-Spandau – Charlottenburg North Bundestag constituency. He is considered a close ally and associate of Armin Laschet, who led the CDU in the 2021 federal election.

Early life and career 
The son of Tanzanian diplomats, Chialo was born in Bonn, North Rhine-Westphalia in 1970. He stated that he and his brother were the only two Black students at the school he attended growing up. Before dropping out, Chialo attended the Friedrich-Alexander University in Erlangen, where he studied history, economics, and political science.

Chialo started his singing career with Blue Manner Haze after receiving a record deal with Sony Music.

Political career 
In the 1990s, Chialo was a member of The Greens and, stated that he was a supporter of Joschka Fischer. Following an internal party dispute over the German government sending Bundeswehr missions in the Balkans, however, he resigned from the party. Chialo joined the CDU in 2016.

Ahead of the 2021 elections, CDU chairman Armin Laschet included Chialo in his eight-member shadow cabinet for the Christian Democrats' campaign. He also ran to represent the party in the election in the Berlin-Spandau – Charlottenburg North constituency. However, he only garnered 23.5% of votes to the 32.8% received by SPD candidate Helmut Kleebank, and therefore lost the election.

In early 2022, Chialo was elected to the national leadership of the CDU.

Personal life 
Chialo is married and has one daughter.

References 

Christian Democratic Union of Germany politicians
German male singers
African diaspora in Germany
1970 births
Living people
German people of Tanzanian descent